A chainless bicycle is a bicycle that transmits power to the driven wheel through a mechanism other than a metal chain.

Examples
 Directly driven "ordinary" bicycle (see penny-farthing)
 Shaft-driven bicycle
 Belt-driven bicycle
 Hydraulic bicycle (and pneumatic bicycle)
 Hybrid vehicle (see series hybrid bicycle)
 Some rowed bikes use a cable or a linkage.
 Stringbike the pulley-driven Hungarian designed bike

See also
Bicycle drivetrain systems
 Outline of cycling

References

External links

Cycle types